The Immediate Geographic Region of Caratinga is one of the 3 immediate geographic regions in the Intermediate Geographic Region of Ipatinga, one of the 70 immediate geographic regions in the Brazilian state of Minas Gerais and one of the 509 of Brazil, created by the National Institute of Geography and Statistics (IBGE) in 2017.

Municipalities 
It comprises 16 municipalities:

 Alvarenga
 Bom Jesus do Galho
 Caratinga
 Córrego Novo
 Entre Folhas
 Imbé de Minas
 Inhapim
 Piedade de Caratinga
 Raul Soares
 Santa Bárbara do Leste
 Santa Rita de Minas
 São Domingos das Dores
 São Sebastião do Anta
 Ubaporanga
 Vargem Alegre
 Vermelho Novo

References 

Geography of Minas Gerais